Sulfite reductase (NADPH) (sulfite (reduced nicotinamide adenine dinucleotide phosphate) reductase, NADPH-sulfite reductase, NADPH-dependent sulfite reductase, H2S-NADP oxidoreductase, sulfite reductase (NADPH2)) is an enzyme with systematic name hydrogen-sulfide:NADP+ oxidoreductase. This enzyme catalises the following chemical reaction

 hydrogen sulfide + 3 NADP+ + 3 H2O  sulfite + 3 NADPH + 3 H+

Sulfite reductase is an iron flavoprotein (FAD and FMN).

References

External links 
 

EC 1.8.1